The 2008 Black Reel Awards, which annually recognize and celebrate the achievements of black people in feature, independent and television films, took place in Washington, D.C. on December 14, 2008. Cadillac Records, The Secret Life of Bees and Slumdog Millionaire all won three awards at the ceremony.

Winners and nominees
Winners are listed first and highlighted in bold.

References

External links
2008 Black Reel Awards

2008 in American cinema
2008 awards in the United States
Black Reel Awards
2007 film awards